SM U-111 was one of the 329 submarines serving in the Imperial German Navy in World War I. She took part in the First Battle of the Atlantic.

Completed at Kiel early in January 1918, she went to the Kiel School for shakedown and training until March, when she joined IV Flotilla. She was monitored continuously by British Naval Intelligence (Room 40), on which her movement reports are based. All her operations took place in 1918.

Service history
She departed 26 March on her first war patrol, operating in the Irish Sea and western entrance to the English Channel, sinking two steamers and returning to Kiel and 23 April. Her second patrol began 27 May, sailing from Heligoland Bight via Muckle Flugga to the western English Channel. She sank at least one confirmed steamer, and returned the same way, arriving 24 June. Her third patrol, between 25 August and 29 September, was via Fastnet and Scillies into the Irish Sea, where she was hampered by British A/S patrols and obtained no sinkings.

She was the only submarine which had a clergyman on board (Wilhelm Meinhold).

Post War Career
U-111 surrendered at Harwich, England 20 November 1918, after the Armistice. On 7 April 1919, under the command of Lieutenant Commander Freeland A. Daubin, she sailed for the United States after 12 days of preparations and testing. On her mast the United States flag flew above the Reich War Flag. She arrived first at Portland, Maine on 18 April 1919, and then in New York City, New York on 19 April 1919 where U-111 docked at the Brooklyn Navy Yard. The U-111, along with four other captured German submarines that were brought to the United States, were used to promote the sale of the Victory Liberty Loan. The U-111 can be seen in a short newsreel film after her arrival on YouTube.

Originally the U-164 was supposed to come to the United States, but it was found in such atrocious shape that the U-111 was substituted. The other ships that were brought over to the United States were U-117, U-140, UB-88, UB-148, and [[SM UC-97|UC-97]]. All sailed to America under their own power except U-140 which was towed. These submarines were listed in U.S. Navy records as the Ex-German Submarine Expeditionary Force.

By early September 1919 the U-111 had completed a head-to-head comparison test against the American submarine USS S-3 (SS-107). It was found that, "The American boat is speedier, has a greater radius of action and is much more habitable than the German boats. Naval officers are of the opinion that the American submarine is the more seaworthy." A summary of the results of the tests from this article are shown in the following table.

{| class="wikitable"
 |+Comparison of German U-111 to American S-3
!Characteristic
!U-111
!S-3
|-
|Maximum surface speed
|13.8 knots
|14.7 knots
|-
|Submerged speed
|7.8 knots
|12.4 knots
|-
|Cruise range
|8,500 miles at 8 knots
|10,000 miles at 11 knots
|-
|Number of torpedoes
|12
|12
|-
|Number of guns
|Two 4-inch, one forward, one aft
|One 4-inch forward
|-
|Displacement
|830 tons
|854 tons
|-
|Length
|235 feet
|231 feet
|-
|Beam
|21 feet
|21.5 feet
|-
|Draft
|12.5 feet
|12.5 feet
|-
|Other findings
|Congested, overly complicated, difficult to maintain
|Habitable, accessible, more seaworthy, decks drier
|}

During the period of October 1919 to April 1920 U-111 was used for mechanical efficiency experiments off the coast of Florida and Cuba.  During these trials she achieved better speeds than in the test results shown above. She was able to go 17.08 knots on the surface, and the submerged speed was almost one knot better than the Germans were able to achieve. The submarine traveled over 11,000 miles, there were no problems during her operation, and the only maintenance performed was of a routine nature (cleaning, painting, etc.). She then made her way to Portsmouth, New Hampshire for decommissioning and destruction.

The U-111'''s final days on the seas were supposed to conclude in 1921. On 18 June 1921, while being towed from Portsmouth, New Hampshire, to be used as a target for aerial bombing by airplanes, she started to take on water. She sank about three miles off the coast of Cape Henry, Virginia, in 35 feet of water, well short of the 50 miles offshore where the tests were to take place. The stern of the submarine remained protruding above the water. Considered a navigation hazard, she was raised on 14 August 1922 by the USS Falcon, placed on pontoons, brought back to Norfolk Navy Yard, where she sank again in Number 3 dry dock before it could be pumped out. The submarine was refloated one more time, patched up, and on 30 August 1922 she made a final journey to sea. The U-111 was sunk on 31 August 1922 when her hatches were opened, and the USS Falcon set off a depth charge by the sub. Her remains are approximately 400 feet below the ocean surface near the Winter Quarters Shoal lightship along the Virginia coast.

The exact site of U-111's remains had been lost to history until September 5, 2022 when shipwreck explorers, using an ROV, identified the wreckage of U-111'' in 400 feet of water 40 miles off the coast of Virginia.

Summary of raiding history

Gallery

References

Notes

Citations

Bibliography

External links
Photos of cruises of German submarine U-54 in 1916-1918.
A 44 min. German film from 1917 about a cruise of the German submarine U-35.

Room 40:  original documents, photos and maps about World War I German submarine warfare and British Room 40 Intelligence from The National Archives, Kew, Richmond, UK.

World War I submarines of Germany
German Type U 93 submarines
Ships built in Kiel
1917 ships
U-boats commissioned in 1917